Two warships of Sweden have been named Illern, after Illern:

 , a  launched in 1918 and sunk in 1943.
 , a  launched in 1957 and stricken in 1980.

Swedish Navy ship names